OutRun is the debut studio album by French electronic musician Kavinsky, released on 22 February 2013 by Record Makers, Vertigo Records and Mercury Records. Production for the album was handled primarily by Kavinsky, along with close friend and fellow French electro house artist Sebastian. The album is named after Sega's 1986 arcade game of the same name, which featured the Ferrari Testarossa.

The concept behind OutRun follows Kavinsky's backstory of a young man who crashed his Testarossa in 1986 and reappeared in 2006 as a zombie who produces electronic music. Kavinsky cites influences from 1980s video games, television cop shows such as Miami Vice, and the films of Dario Argento.

Singles
"ProtoVision" was released on 10 December 2012 as the album's official lead single. The music video, directed by Marcus Herring, was released on 7 December 2012 on Vimeo and on 10 December 2012 on YouTube.

Usage in media
A one-minute snippet of the song "Odd Look" was used in a 2012 French commercial for BMW i, which was shown in cinemas. "Nightcall" plays during the opening credits of the 2011 film Drive. "Roadgame" has been used by Mercedes-Benz in a 2012 French commercial and in 2015 for the Italian commercial of the CLA Shooting Brake. It was also used when Manchester City players and their staff arrives at the Etihad Stadium from their bus during their home matches. In a British 2021 TV commercial for Gusto pre-prepared food ingredient boxes, a short clip of "Rampage" was used as an example of 80's electronica.

Critical reception

OutRun received generally positive reviews from music critics. At Metacritic, which assigns a normalised rating out of 100 to reviews from mainstream publications, the album received an average score of 75, based on 12 reviews.

Track listing

Personnel
Credits adapted from the liner notes of OutRun.

Musicians
 Kavinsky – vocals 
 Paul Hahn – voice 
 Raw Man – guitars 
 Sebastian – vocals 
 Havoc – vocals 
 Lovefoxxx – vocals 
 Tyson – vocals 
 José Reis Fontão – backing vocals

Technical
 Kavinsky – production 
 Sebastian – production ; mixing 
 A-Trak – recording 
 Guy-Manuel de Homem-Christo – production 
 Florian Lagatta – engineering 
 David Mestre – recording

Artwork
 The Directors Bureau Special Projects – album art concept, photography
 Marcus Herring – director
 Tari Segal – director of photography
 Benjamin Glovitz – production
 Duffy Culligan – executive production
 Charlotte Delarue – art direction
 Adrien Blanchat – image manipulation
 Graphame – layout

Charts

Weekly charts

Year-end charts

Certifications

Release history

Notes

References

2013 debut albums
Albums produced by Guy-Manuel de Homem-Christo
Casablanca Records albums
Concept albums
Mercury Records albums
Republic Records albums
Kavinsky albums
Synthwave albums
Vertigo Records albums